Lovango Cay is a private island in the district of St. John, in the United States Virgin Islands.

The island has been sparsely inhabited since at least 1728. The peak recorded population was 49 people in 1917, at which point there was briefly a school.

The island hosts an eco-responsible housing development called Loving Cay Estates. The island is self-sufficient and hosts its own solar array, wind turbine, and reverse-osmosis desalination facility. New island developments include a pool and beach club.

Accessible only by boat, the north side of the cay features a small bay. With Congo Cay to the north, the water here tends to stay calm and offers very good snorkeling. Among other things, nurse sharks are often found resting here during the day.

The south side of the island is a popular snorkeling spot for charter boats from St. John and St. Thomas.

References

Islands of the United States Virgin Islands
Private islands of the United States Virgin Islands